Several countries have interfered with or banned access to the telecommunications application software Skype. The use of the website has also been restricted in other ways.

Censorship by country

Uzbekistan
After issuance of the new amendment (Article 27.1) to the Personal Data Law on January 14, 2021, Uzbekistan government started demanding foreign agencies to store its citizens' data on Uzbekistan soil. Several companies ignored the request. Thus, Uzbekistan government formally issued a statement saying it blocked several of them including Skype, TikTok, Twitter.

Bangladesh
After the complaint from Bangladesh Awami League about using Skype for election interview process by the opposition party of Bangladesh, The Bangladesh Nationalist Party, Bangladesh Telecommunication Regulatory Commission has blocked the telecommunications application Skype.com.

Morocco
Morocco has boycott Skype as a part of the North African country's telecommunication operators that implemented the ban.

Oman
Skype was blocked in Oman for several years as well as others voice calling services. In March 2020, Skype was unblocked following the coronavirus pandemic.

China
Disruption to Skype began in October 2017. The Ministry of Public Security reported that a number of voice over internet protocol apps do not comply with local laws and has since removed Skype from the app store in China, though it is not widely used by domestic consumers.

United Arab Emirates
In the United Arab Emirates, unlicensed VoIP services are blocked. VoIP technology used by various apps such as WhatsApp, Facebook, Viber and Snapchat are inoperative. The Telecommunications Regulatory Authority (TRA) blocked Skype in January 2018, explaining that the service is not licensed. UAE-based telecom operators offer paid VoIP service through their applications BOTIM and C’Me. The block is attributed to the potential loss of revenues that operators such as Du and Etisalat would face as a result of reduced demand for their own telecom services.
The blocking of VoIP is a controversial topic in UAE, with many citizens asking for the block of the technology to be removed. However, by using a VPN to access UAE Skype, you will be able to easily gain full access to UAE Skype.

Saudi Arabia 
Saudi Arabia censors a wide range of media, including books, newspapers, magazines, films, television, and Internet content. The Saudi government closely monitors and restricts the media in accordance with official state law. Many Internet activities such as websites and VoIP (WhatsApp calling, Skype etc.) are strictly restricted in Saudi Arabia.

See also
Criticism of Facebook#Censorship controversies
Censorship of Facebook

References

Skype
Skype